André Jolivard (15 September 1787, in Le Mans – 8 December 1851, in Paris) was a French landscape painter.

Biography
His father, Louis-Modeste Jolivard, was a merchant. He was named after his great-uncle and godfather, André Jolivard, who was a canon at the Church of Sainte-Radegonde in Poitiers.

After seeing combat in the Battle of Leipzig, he was mustered out in 1814 and returned to his legal studies, obtaining his diploma in 1816, but he chose to pursue a career in the arts instead. 

As a student of Jean-Victor Bertin, he became a popular landscape painter. He held his first exhibit at the Salon in 1819 and participated every few years until 1839; receiving a medal in 1827. He was decorated with the Legion of Honor in 1835, the year that his painting "Farm Donkeys" was acquired by the State.

He died in 1851 as the result of an accident stemming from the Coup d'état. While opening his window, he was struck in the wrist by a stray bullet and the wound became infected with tetanus. The contents of his studio and his art collection were sold at auction and dispersed in 1852.

His works may be seen at the Musée des beaux-arts de Bordeaux, the Musée des beaux-arts de Rouen and the Musée Lambinet, among others.

References 

 Charles Gabet: Dictionnaire des artistes de l'école française au XIXe siècle. Paris 1831, S. 373 (Online)
 Biography @ the Oxford Index

Further reading 
 Fortuné Legeay, Nécrologie et bibliographie contemporaines de la Sarthe 1844–1880, 1881.

External links 

1787 births
1851 deaths
19th-century French painters
French landscape painters
People from Le Mans
Deaths from tetanus